John Love Jones (1885 – 21 December 1913) was a Welsh footballer who played in the English Football League for Stoke and Middlesbrough, and he also made two appearances for Wales.

Career
Jones began his career with home town club Rhyl before joining Stoke in 1905. He played 11 matches for Stoke in 1905–06 scoring three goals, but after only playing in two matches in 1906–07 he was allowed to join Crewe Alexandra. He re-entered league football with Middlesbrough in 1908 but left for Portsmouth after failing to score. At "Pompey" he scored 19 goals in 41 matches before his death on 13 December at the age of 28.

His made his Welsh debut whilst with Stoke in 1906, in a 2–0 victory against Scotland, with Jones scoring one of the goals. His second and final cap came against Ireland in 1910, in a 4–1 Welsh win.

Career statistics

Club
Source:

International
Source:

References

1885 births
1913 deaths
Welsh footballers
Wales international footballers
Crewe Alexandra F.C. players
Middlesbrough F.C. players
Stoke City F.C. players
Portsmouth F.C. players
English Football League players
Southern Football League players
Rhyl F.C. players
Association football forwards